The Chronicle of the Morea is a long 14th-century history text, of which four versions are extant: in French, Greek (in verse), Italian and Aragonese.  More than 9,000 lines long, the Chronicle narrates events of the Franks' establishment of feudalism in mainland Greece.  West European Crusaders settled in the Peloponnese (called Morea at the time) following the Fourth Crusade.  The period covered in the Chronicle was 1204 to 1292 (or later, depending on the version).  It gives significant details on the civic organization of the Principality of Achaia.

The extant texts of the Chronicle of the Morea
The Greek text is the only text written in verse.  The French, Italian and Aragonese texts are written in prose.

Greek text
The verses of the Greek text are written in a 15-syllable political verse. The verses are accented but not rhymed. It is written in the spoken Greek of the time, with the inclusion of several French words.

There are two parallel Greek texts, as well as three copies:
Ms Havniensis 57 (14th–15th century, in Copenhagen) 9219 verses
Ms Taurinensis B.II.I, library of Turin, closely related to the Copenhagen text
Ms Parisinus graecus 2898 (15th–16th century, at the Bibliothèque nationale de France, Paris) 8191 verses
Ms Parisinus graecus 2753 and
Ms Bern 509 grec, both copies of the Paris version.

The oldest text is that held in Copenhagen, the language of which is more archaic. The Parisian, more recent, text is simpler in language and has fewer foreign words.  The transcriber omitted several anti-Hellenic references, so the overall text expressed less contempt of Greeks.

The difference of about one century between the Copenhagen and Parisian version shows a considerable number of linguistic differences due to the rapid evolution of the Greek language. The text of the Copenhagen version describes events until 1292.

French text
Royal Library of Belgium No 15702
This text is known under the title: "The Book of the Conquest of Constantinople and
the Empire of Roumania and the country of the Principality of Morea", since in the incipit, it is indicated "C'est le livre de la conqueste de Constantinople et de l'empire de Romanie, et dou pays de la princée de la Morée"

Information in this text reaches until the year 1304.

Italian text
Cronaca di Morea, is a summary that was compiled later than the previous texts and contains several mistakes. Its source is the text found in the Greek manuscript held in Turin.

Aragonese text
Libro de los fechos et conquistas del principado de la Morea, was compiled at the end of the 14th century, in 1393, from the Greek version and other later sources, at the request of the Grand Master Jean Fernandez de Heredia of the Knights of St. John. It covers events to 1393.

Which text is the original? Which version came out first?
It appears that the original text of the Chronicle of the Morea has been lost. Although the Aragonese and Italian texts have been clearly identified as later texts, there is no widely accepted consensus on the priority of the Greek or French text.

The Author
The author of the original text of the chronicle appears to be a Franc or a gasmoule (a French-Greek, born from a mixed French-Greek marriage, the word seems to have an etymology from garçon (boy) and mule). He appeared to admire the Franks (Crusaders) and have contempt of the local population and the Roman Empire. Notably, the author respects the citizenship of the Byzantine Greeks, calling them Romans (Ρωμαῖοι) (especially in verses 1720–1738).

The significance of the Chronicle
The Chronicle is famous in spite of certain historical inaccuracies because of its lively description of life in the feudal community and because of the character of the language which reflects the rapid transition from Medieval to Modern Greek.

Polet explains that since the author admired the Franks and had contempt for the Byzantine culture, the Chronicle of Morea did not become part of popular culture and history after the Franks left the Peloponnese.

Numerous administrative laws and practices of the Principality of Achaia are  mentioned in the Chronicle, making it a significant source on the Frankish period in Greece.

Language of the Chronicle
Since the year of the Fall of Constantinople, 1453, marks the symbolic boundary between Medieval and Modern Greek, the Chronicle of the Morea is generally classified under Medieval Greek. However, the Chronicle of the Morea, along with the Ptochoprodromic poems and acritic songs are considered as the beginnings of modern Greek literature.  They are classified as part of both "Byzantine / medieval vernacular" and "(early) modern Greek" literature.

The first editions in print
The first printed edition of the Chronicle was published in 1840 by J.A. Buchon.  It contained the Greek text from Paris.

Buchon named the book Βιβλίον της κουγκέστας του Μωραίως (Book of the conquest of Morea), a different title than the text.  The second printed edition of the Chronicle was that of the Greek text from Copenhagen, published by Buchon in 1845.  In 1889 John Schmitt published both texts of the Copenhagen and Paris manuscripts side by side.

Translations
A 1964 translation of the Greek text by Harold E. Lurier.

The first text
The book begins with a prologue of 1302 verses. The first three verses are:

I will tell a tale to thee rehearse, a tale of import mighty
And if attention you do lend, I hope the tale will please you
T'is how the Frank by arms did gain the realm of fair Morea

Notes

References
The original Greek text of the Chronicle of Morea
 
Crusaders as Conquerors: the Chronicle of Morea translated from the Greek with notes and introduction by Harold E. Lurier, Columbia University Press, 1964.  .
Peter Topping, Review of H.E. Lurier, Crusaders as Conquerors: the Chronicle of Morea, in Speculum, Vol. 40, No. 4 (Oct 1965), pp. 737–742.
 Shawcross, C. Teresa, The Chronicle of Morea: Historiography in Crusader Greece (Oxford, OUP, 2009) (Oxford Studies in Byzantium).

Further reading 
 H. F. Tozer, "The Franks in the Peloponnese", Journal of Hellenic Studies, 4 (1883), pp. 165–236

13th-century history books
Crusade chronicles
Morea
Morea
Morea
Medieval Peloponnese